Eupithecia mystica is a moth in the family Geometridae. It is found in Ukraine, North Macedonia, Greece and Romania.

The wingspan is about 17 mm.

References

Moths described in 1910
mystica
Moths of Europe